Mary Stuart O'Donnell  (Irish: Máire Stíobhartach Ní Dhomhnaill; 1607 - in or after 1639) was an Irish noblewoman.

Biography
Mary was the daughter of Rory O'Donnell, 1st Earl of Tyrconnell and Bridget, daughter of Henry FitzGerald, 12th Earl of Kildare. She was born in England after her father's flight (see Flight of the Earls), and the royal name "Stuart" was given to her by King James I. Her mother Bridget returned to Ireland with Mary in 1609, where they lived on the FitzGerald estates in Kildare until 1619, after which they were summoned to live in England. She was granted a generous dowry by the king and was placed into the care of her grandmother, Lady Kildare.

Mary lived in London for the next few years where Lady Kildare attempted to Anglicise the young girl and proposed to leave Mary her substantial inheritance and to provide a husband for her. Mary objected to the favoured suitor on the grounds that he was an Irishman who had converted to Protestantism; perhaps also because she had formed a previous attachment to Dualtach O'Gallagher. Much to the consternation of her mother's family, she increasingly associated with the young, disaffected Irish Catholics of London. In the summer of 1626, Mary and several friends broke into Gatehouse Prison and freed her half-brother Caffer "Con" O'Donnell and her first cousin, Hugh (Aedh) O'Rourke, who had recently been incarcerated for refusing to revoke their claims over planted land in Ireland.  Following this incident her identity was compromised and she was ordered to appear before the royal court. She instead opted to flee London during the latter months of 1626. Dressed in male attire, and wearing a sword, she got clear of London, and after many wanderings arrived in Bristol. She was accompanied by a maid, Anne Baynham, similarly disguised, and by a young "gentilhomme son parent", who was most likely O'Gallagher.

At Bristol her sex was suspected; but, according to a Spanish panegyrist, who likens her to various saints, she bribed a magistrate, offered to fight a duel, and made fierce love to another girl. Two attempts were made to reach Ireland, but the ship was beaten back into the Severn. At last Mary Stuart got off in a Dutch vessel, and was carried, with her two companions, to La Rochelle. She retained her doublet, boots, and sword, and at Poitiers made love to another lady. On her arrival at Brussels in January 1627, Pope Urban VIII wrote a special congratulatory letter; but she soon estranged her elder brother, Hugh, who she had never met before, by continuing to seek adventures in man's clothes and for refusing to marry yet another suitor, John O'Neill, 3rd Earl of Tyrone. Hugh had hoped to allay hostilities between the O'Donnell and O'Neill dynasties in preparation for a planned invasion of Ireland in 1627 by enlisting the help of Archbishop Florence Conry, who arranged for Mary to marry the Earl of Tyrone. Her secret relationship with O'Gallagher was exposed when she became pregnant in 1629 and they fled Brussels in disgrace.

She and O'Gallagher arrived in Rome in 1630, where she was greeted with admiration as the daughter of the late Rory O'Donnell, and was provided a place to live and financial support by the Catholic Church. They married and she gave birth to a boy in Genoa, and in February 1632 wrote to Cardinal Barberini, saying that another child was expected. They later moved to Austria where O'Gallagher rose to the rank of captain in the Imperial Army in 1635, but was killed that same year fighting in the Thirty Years' War. Her infant son fell ill and died shortly after her husband's passing. Beset by grief and estranged from her family, she travelled Europe once again before eventually settling down in Rome, where she married a poor Irish naval captain in 1639. Nothing more is known of her life after this.

Family tree

Notes

References

Attribution

Further reading

Daughters of Irish earls
17th-century Irish women